The 26th Ryder Cup Matches were held 13–15 September 1985 at the Brabazon Course of The Belfry in Wishaw, Warwickshire, England. Team Europe won the competition for the first time by a score of 16 to 11 points. This marked the first U.S. loss since 1957, previously the sole U.S. loss in fifty years.

Europe took a two-point lead into the Sunday singles and increased their lead throughout Sunday. It fell to Sam Torrance to secure the winning margin when he holed a  putt on the 18th hole to defeat Andy North 1 up and go up 14 to 8, a six-point margin with five matches on the course.

This was the last Ryder Cup played in Europe that was not shown on live television in the United States. The USA Network first televised it in 1989 on cable with video provided by the BBC. NBC Sports took over live weekend coverage in 1991 in South Carolina, and 1993 marked the first time a major U.S. network televised it live from Europe.

Format
The Ryder Cup is a match play event, with each match worth one point.  The competition format in 1985 was as follows:
Day 1 — 4 foursome (alternate shot) matches in a morning session and 4 four-ball (better ball) matches in an afternoon session
Day 2 — 4 four-ball matches in a morning session and 4 foursome matches in an afternoon session
Day 3 — 12 singles matches
With a total of 28 points, 14 points were required to win the Cup.  All matches were played to a maximum of 18 holes.

Teams
Nine of the European team were chosen from the 1985 European Tour money list at the conclusion of the Benson & Hedges International Open on 18 August with the remaining three team members being chosen immediately after the final event by the team captain, Tony Jacklin. Prior to the final event Christy O'Connor Jnr was in the 9th qualifying position. However he missed the cut in the Benson & Hedges International Open and was overtaken by José María Cañizares, O'Connor finishing just £115.89 behind Cañizares. Jacklin's choices of Nick Faldo and Ken Brown were widely expected but his choice of José Rivero was a surprise.

Captains picks are shown in yellow.

North qualified by virtue of winning the 1985 U.S. Open, while Green qualified by winning the 1985 PGA Championship.

Friday's matches

Morning foursomes

Afternoon four-ball

Saturday's matches

Morning four-ball

Afternoon foursomes

Sunday's singles matches

Individual player records
Each entry refers to the win–loss–half record of the player.

Source:

Europe

United States

References

External links
PGA of America: 1985 Ryder Cup
About.com: 1985 Ryder Cup

Ryder Cup
Golf tournaments in England
Sport in Warwickshire
Ryder Cup
Ryder Cup
Ryder Cup